Emticicia is a Gram-negative bacterial genus from the family of Spirosomaceae.

References

Further reading 
 
 
 
 

Cytophagia
Bacteria genera